Presidential elections were held in Liberia in May 1873. The result was a victory for incumbent President Joseph Jenkins Roberts of the Republican Party.

References

Liberia
1873 in Liberia
Elections in Liberia
May 1873 events
Election and referendum articles with incomplete results